Achryson immaculipenne is a species of longhorn beetle in the Cerambycinae subfamily. It was described by Gounelle in 1909. It is known from Brazil, Colombia, Bolivia,  French Guiana, and Ecuador.

References

Achrysonini
Beetles described in 1909